The Golden Bell Award for Best Host in a Reality or Game Show is one of the categories of the competition for the Taiwanese television production, Golden Bell Awards. It has been awarded since 2017.

Award winners

2020s

References

Host in a Reality or Game Show, Best
Golden Bell Awards, Best Host in a Reality or Game Show